Profilinota is a monotypic moth genus in the family Depressariidae erected by John Frederick Gates Clarke in 1973. Its only species, Profilinota notaula, was first described by Edward Meyrick in 1933. It is found in Bolivia and Venezuela.

References

Moths described in 1933
Depressariinae
Monotypic moth genera